Tragocephala formosa is a species of beetle in the family Cerambycidae. It was described by Olivier in 1792, originally under the genus Lamia. It is known from Mozambique, South Africa, Malawi, Kenya, and Zimbabwe, and has been introduced into Seychelles.

Varietas
 Tragocephala formosa var. gemina Distant, 1904
 Tragocephala formosa var. comitessa White, 1856
 Tragocephala formosa var. thomsoni Aurivillius, 1921
 Tragocephala formosa var. praetoria Chevrolat, 1858

References

formosa
Beetles described in 1792